Darren Mullings (born 3 March 1987) is an English semi-professional footballer who plays as a midfielder and is a player-coach for Yate Town.

Career
A former England schoolboy under 18 international and England colleges under 19 international. After leaving South Gloucestershire and Stroud College, Mullings began his career as a trainee with Bristol Rovers, turning professional in July 2005. His league debut came on 31 December 2005 when he was a second-half substitute for Craig Disley in Rovers' 2–1 defeat at home to Wycombe Wanderers. He made three further league appearances, all as substitute, that season, but failed to feature in the 2006–07 season and was loaned to Clevedon Town in October 2006.

He was released by Rovers at the end of the 2006–07 season and joined Torquay United in June 2007. He scored on his Torquay debut, but was later sent off as Torquay won 5–4 away to Histon on 18 September 2007. He was loaned to Tiverton Town in November 2007 and was released by Torquay at the end of the season

Mullings joined Conference South side Weston-super-Mare on trial in July 2008, scoring on his debut in a 1–1 pre-season draw against Exeter City. He signed a contract with Weston in August 2008. He has now joined Conference North side Gloucester City and scored on his debut in a friendly against Bitton. In March 2014, Mullings jumped ship to fellow Conference North side Oxford City, citing financial reasons. After a few months at Weston-super-Mare, Mullings re-joined Gloucester City. After a season and a half back at the club, he left to join fellow National South side Chippenham Town in November 2017. In August 2018, Mullings joined Salisbury as the travelling and training demands at Salisbury suited him better with his commitments with Bristol City. In August 2020, Mullings was appointed as player-coach at Salisbury. On 2 November 2022, Mullings departed Salisbury. Two days later, he joined Yate Town on a player-coach basis.

References

External links

1987 births
Living people
English footballers
Footballers from Bristol
Association football midfielders
English Football League players
National League (English football) players
Bristol Rovers F.C. players
Clevedon Town F.C. players
Torquay United F.C. players
Tiverton Town F.C. players
Weston-super-Mare A.F.C. players
Gloucester City A.F.C. players
Oxford City F.C. players
Chippenham Town F.C. players
Salisbury F.C. players